Kohat is a city that serves as the capital of the Kohat District in Khyber Pakhtunkhwa, Pakistan. It is regarded as a centre of the Bangash tribe of Pashtuns, who have lived in the region since the late 15th century. With a population of over 220,000 people, the city is the fourth-largest in Khyber Pakhtunkhwa and the 35th-largest in Pakistan in terms of population. Kohat's immediate environs were the site of frequent armed skirmishes between British colonialist forces and local tribesmen in the mid to late 19th century. It is centred on a British-era fort, various bazaars, and a military cantonment. Pashto and the Kohati dialect of Hindko are the main languages spoken in Kohat.

The city of Kohat is also the namesake of and largest city in the Kohat Division, being over four times larger than the second-largest city in the division: Karak.

History

Early history 

Little is known of Kohat's early history. According to local lore, Kohat was founded by an ancient Buddhist king by the name of Raja Kohat. Another Buddhist Raja named Adh is believed to have established his domain on the north side of the city. A fort, now in ruins, serves as a marker of their domain. The remains of this fort known as Adh-e-Samut, is possibly named after Buddhist Raja Adh. The fort is still fitted with weaponry from the Buddhist period. The Buddhist kings built roads, which were in use until the end of the Mughal rule.

The region had been primarily populated by Orakzai Pashtuns, who were then displaced from the west by the Bangash in the 14th-15th centuries, and Khattaks from the south. The Kohat region was likely firmly dominated by Bangash tribesmen by the early late 15th century following a decisive battle at nearby Alizai, after which Bangash tribes settled in the fertile valleys and assimilated remaining indigenous inhabitants into the larger Bangash tribe, while Orakzai tribes were confined to the nearby hills.

The first historical record of the city comes from the Baburnama autobiography of Mughal emperor Babur. After capturing Peshawar, Babur was reportedly told of vast riches in Kohat. He invaded and plundered Kohat in 1505, only to discover the tales of its wealth were exaggerated. After capturing Kohat, Babur's army marched towards Bangash country, where he defeated a band of tribesmen.

Durrani period 

During the Persian Empire's invasion of the Mughal Empire in the 1730s and 1740s, Kohat escaped destruction as Emperor Nader Shah's forces followed invasion routes north in the Peshawar Valley. Following the departure of Persian forces, Kohat was absorbed into the Durrani Empire by 1747.

Following the fall of Shah Shuja Durrani in 1810, Kohat was brought under control of the Durrani kingdom based in Peshawar and Kabul, which leased lordship of the city to various chiefs.  The first chief of Kohat was Mirza Girani, who was followed in succession until 1818 by Shakur Khan, and Sultan Muhammad. In 1818, Kohat came under the control of Samad Khan following the collapse of Durrani suzerainty, though the city then came under the influence of Pir Muhammad in 1827.

Sikh period 
Ranjit Singh's armies marched to Peshawar in 1819. In 1834, Azim Khan was defeated by the Sikhs and the chiefs of Peshawar became tributaries of the Sikh Government. Kohat was captured by Sikh governor Avtar Singh Sandhanwalia in 1839, and became part of Ranjit Singh's Sikh Empire, though Pir Muhammad was allowed to continue administering the region around Kohat.

In 1840, the Sikhs abandoned Kohat, and Sultan Mohammed became ruler of Kohat. In 1848 during the Second Anglo-Sikh War, Colonel George Lawrence, the British Resident at Lahore, sought refuge in Kohat, but was instead taken prisoner and handed to Sikh forces in Peshawar under Chattar Singh before being released. In 1849, Kohat and the rest of Punjab was formally annexed by the British.

British period 

Following British victory over the Sikhs in 1848, Kohat came under British rule and was annexed in March 1849. Lieutenant Pollack was appointed as Kohat's first Assistant Commissioner. British authorities in Peshawar commenced construction of the Kohat Pass road in 1849, and completed it by 1850 despite violent opposition from local tribes. The pass was closed temporarily in 1853 after a quarrel arose among nearby tribes. The road which connected Kohat to Rawalpindi via Khushalgarh was of little trouble compared to the Kohat Pass road.

Kohat remained largely peaceful during the Sepoy Mutiny of 1857, and local Pashtun soldiers largely ignored calls for rebellion. The British established a Hill Station at Cherat, just north of Kohat, in the 1860s. Kohat Pass road was closed on and off for several more years on account of quarrels among local tribes, including in 1865 when it was closed for more than one and a half years. Armed skirmishes between British forces and Pashtun tribesmen continued on and off between the 1860s and 1870s. Kohat Cantonment was established by the British in 1874. Routes between Kohat and Bannu and Thall were frequently blockaded by Wazir tribesmen by 1880 that resulted in large clashes between the British and Wazirs.

In 1924, Kohat was the scene of widespread communal rioting that resulted in a 21-day fast by Mohandas Gandhi as a plea for unity. During the 1947 Kashmir War, Pashtun tribesmen from around the region convened in Kohat before departing for Kashmir in hopes of capturing the territory for Pakistan.

Modern period 

Kohat suffered several attacks during the War in North-West Pakistan and War on Terror between 2008 and 2014. 35 people were killed in a suicide bombing in 2009, while twin bombings in April 2010 killed 41. 20 more were killed in a suicide bombing in September 2010, while the Kohat Tunnel was attacked by the Pakistani Taliban in January 2011, resulting in the deaths of 5 people. 2 more were killed in a bomb attack in July 2013. In February 2014, 12 were killed in a roadside blast near the city, while 6 more were killed in an attack on a van in October 2014. After a few years' lull in violence, 5 policemen were killed outside of Kohat following an anti-terror operation in May 2017.

Geography

Topography 

Kohat Pass lies to the north. The total area of the district is

Climate 
Kohat has a hot semi-arid climate (Köppen climate classification BSh).

Dam
Kohat has a dam called Tanda Dam located on Tanda Lake, which is a protected site under the Ramsar Convention. Completed in 1967, it was included as a Ramsar site on July 23, 1976.

Parks

Tanda Wildlife Park 
Tanda Wildlife Park is located near Kohat city. The total area of the park is 2800 acres, consisting of Tanda reservoir and its catchments in Kohat. This is the largest wildlife park of Khyber Pakhtunkhwa. Its wonderfully rich and varied landscape supports a range of mammals and birds, both migratory and indigenous, as well as a few reptiles.kohat is famous for guava.

The park is bounded by three different villages, Bar, Kaghazi, and Tanda Banda. The park is approachable by Hangu-kaghazi gravel road, shahpur-Bar road which is 18 km from Kohat.

The local people do not have any right of grazing, lopping or firewood collection as the ownership lies with the provincial government. The park area falls in the natural habitat of urial and chinkara, and also provides suitable habitat to hog deer. The urial is associated with scrub forest of Olea species and Accassia species. Urial were once abundant in the area but due to continuous habitat destruction these were disappeared from the area in the near past. The natural habitat of urial and chinkara lies in close proximity of human habitation.

Kotal Pheasantry
Kotal Pheasantry is established in Kotal wildlife park in district Kohat over an area of 1 kanal, with an objective to propagate and provide breeding environment to exotic/indigenous wildlife species like silver pheasant, golden pheasant, reeves pheasant, pea-cock etc. About 20-30 visitors including students and general public visit the pheasantry for education and recreation purposes per day. There are four species of pheasants in the pheasantry including ring necked pheasant, silver pheasant, peacock pheasant and white pheasant.

Transportation

Rail
Construction of the Kohat Tehsil railway station and railway line was started in 1897, and was completed in 1902. The Kohat Cantonment railway station serves as the terminus for the Khushalgarh–Kohat–Thal Railway - which ceased onward narrow gauge (762 mm or 2 ft 6 in) railway service to Thall in 1991. Kohat is the terminus railway station of Kohat-Jand railway line and has daily train service to Rawalpindi.

Air

The nearest airport served by commercial services is Bacha Khan International Airport in Peshawar. Kohat Airbase  is a Pakistan Air Force base that began as a runway built by the British. PIA once used the airport using de Havilland Twin Otter, though Kohat is no longer served by commercial services.

Road
Kohat is a major node on the N-55 Indus Highway that connects Peshawar to Karachi, and the N-80 highway that connects Kohat to Islamabad. The  Kohat Tunnel was completed in 2004, and connects the southern districts of Khyber Pakhtunkhwa to Peshawar. Constructed with Japanese assistance, the tunnel drastically reduced travel times across the Kohat Pass.

Media
 Radio Pakistan Kohat
 Kohat Press Club

In popular culture
Kohat plays a central role in the eighth season of U.S. political thriller Homeland particularly in the episodes Threnody(s), In Full Flight and Designated Driver.

Education

Universities
 University of Engineering and Technology Peshawar Kohat Campus
 Kohat University of Science & Technology
 Preston University in Kohat

Colleges
 Cadet College Kohat
 Garrison Cadet College Kohat
 Government degree college kohat

Historical military significance
Kohat Cantonment was established in the British Era, and it is one of the eight cantonments falling in the Peshawar region. 
Kohat is also the headquarters of Pakistan's Inter Services Selection Board (ISSB ), which selects commissioned officers for the Pakistan armed forces of Pakistan including the Army, Navy and Air Force.

Notable people 

 Ahmad Faraz Famous Pakistani Poet who was born in Kohat
 Iftikhar Hussain Shah Former Governor of Khyber-Pakhtunkhwa province 
 Malik Saad
 Afzal Bangash Politician and co-founder and president of the Mazdoor Kisan Party
 Shahid Afridi (Urdu: شاہد افریدی; Pashto: شاهد افریدی; born 1 March 1980, chiefly known as Shahid Afridi, also referred to in the media as Boom Boom, is a Pakistani international cricketer and the former captain of the Pakistan national cricket team.
 Rohan Mustafa, Pakistani-born United Arab Emirates cricketer.
 Khalid Mansoor Paracha,Chairman Public Service Commission, SMBR

See also

 List of cities in Pakistan by population
 List of cities in Khyber Pakhtunkhwa by population
 Kohat Division
 Hangu District
 Doaba
 Hangu
 Tall
 Karak District
 Karak
 Kohat District
 Lachi
 Shakardara
 Kurram District
 Parachinar
 Sadda
 Orakzai District
 Pashto
 Hindko
 Kohati
 1924 Kohat riots
 Jhandi railway station

References

External links

 Sarhad Tourism Corporation, Government of Khyber Pakhtunkhwa, Pakistan
 
 Members National Assembly
 Members Provincial Assembly

Populated places in Kohat District
Cities in Khyber Pakhtunkhwa